Wang Pong is a district (amphoe) in the western part of Phetchabun province, central Thailand.

History
The three tambons Wang Pong, Thai Dong, and Sap Poep were separated from Chon Daen district and made a minor district (king amphoe) on 1 December 1983. It was upgraded to a full district on 21 May 1990.

The original name of this area was Ban Wang Din Pong.

Geography
Neighboring districts are (from the north clockwise) Mueang Phetchabun and Chon Daen of Phetchabun Province, Tap Khlo of Phichit province, and Noen Maprang of Phitsanulok province.

Administration
The district is divided into five sub-districts (tambons), which are further subdivided into 58 villages (mubans). There are two townships (thesaban tambons) in the district: Wang Pong and Thai Dong, each covering parts of the same-named tambons. There are a further five tambon administrative organizations (TAO).

References

External links
amphoe.com

Wang Pong